A screamer is a circus march intended to stir up the audience during the show.

History 
Screamers were mostly composed in a 60-year period (1895–1955). Circuses were in need of music that would stir the audience into a frenzy, as four-footed animals galloped across the ring. Because march music was a prominent part of American music at that time, and because it carried such a quick tempo, it was this that ringmasters demanded.

Musicality 

Circus marches are faster than a normal military march, often 130 to 150 beats/minute. Although screamers tend to follow the march form, they are often abbreviated, and additions, such as a quick cornet call introduction to a new melody, are included. A typical screamer lasts a minute to three and a half minutes.

Screamers are a very demanding type of music, due to their extremely fast and advanced rhythms, especially the low-brass parts. Double and even triple tonguing is often required in order to play these rhythms. The trio in "The Melody Shop" is a good example of this. Many screamers have two prominent melodies playing at once. Although this is not unusual in a march, screamers tend to go further with this. The low-brass section can be playing a long, stately melody, while the woodwinds can be moving along with a phrase of 16th notes, or vice versa. Due to the circumstances in which screamers are played, dynamics tend to stay at a level forte. Unlike some military marches, piano is rarely used.

Composers 
Composers of screamers included Karl L. King, whose work included "Barnum & Bailey's Favorite", Fred Jewell and Henry Fillmore. John Philip Sousa wrote "On Parade" and a few others, but his writing in the circus march style is not highly regarded.

Examples 
 The ABA March by Edwin Franko Goldman
 Americans We by Henry Fillmore
 Barnum and Bailey's Favorite by Karl L. King
 Bennett's Triumphal by Melvin H. Ribble
 The Big Cage by Karl L. King
 The Billboard March by John N. Klohr
 Bombasto by Orion R. Farrar
 Bones Trombone by Henry Fillmore
 Bravura by Charles E. Duble
 Bugles and Drums by Edwin Franko Goldman
 The Circus Bee by Henry Fillmore
 Circus Days by Karl L. King
 Circus Echoes by Arthur W. Hughes
 Circus King by Charles E. Duble
 Coat of Arms by George Kenny
 Floto's Triumph by Fred Jewell
 His Honor by Henry Fillmore
 Invictus by Karl L. King
 Klaxon by Henry Fillmore
 The Melody Shop by Karl L. King
 Onward and Upward by Edwin Franko Goldman
 Robinson's Grand Entree by Karl L. King
 Rolling Thunder by Henry Fillmore
 Sells-Floto Triumphal by Karl L. King 
 The Squealer by Will Huff
 The Screamer by Frederick Jewell
 Smilin' Jack by Robert S. Keller
 Them Basses by Getty H. Huffine

Marches composed for standard march tempo but frequently performed as screamers
 Entrance of the Gladiators (also known as Thunder and Blazes when played as a screamer) by Julius Fučík

See also 
 Circus music
 American march music

Notes

References 
Fennell, Dr. Frederick: Screamers (Circus Marches), Eastman Wind Ensemble.  
Whitmarsch, Richard: Sounds of the Circus (28 volumes of circus music) 

Circus music
March music